Bryolymnia poasia is a moth of the family Noctuidae first described by William Schaus in 1911. It is found in Costa Rica.

The length of the forewings is 12–14 mm.

External links

Hadeninae
Moths described in 1911